The Turkish men's national ice hockey team is the national ice hockey team of Turkey, and is controlled by the Turkish Ice Hockey Federation (TBHF), a member of the International Ice Hockey Federation. It is currently ranked 42nd in the IIHF World Ranking.

History
In 2014, the Turkish Ice Hockey Federation caused a scandal as a foreigner wearing Turkish national jersey played in a friendly international match. Denis Legersky from Slovakia, who plays since three and a half years in Turkey and is currently a member of İzmir BB GSK, was registered in the match against Bosnia and Herzegovina national ice hockey team as a coach–player. He, appeared in the jersey of Ogün Uzunali though not a Turkish citizen, and scored two goals in the match played in Sarajevo before 8,000 spectators that ended 7–2 for the Turkey national team. The officials of the Ministry of Youth and Sports protested the incident.

Results Summary
As of 1 Jan 2023.

OTW and OTL Suppose Draw.

Olympics
The Turkey men's hockey team has never qualified for an Olympic tournament.

Ice hockey at the 2010 Winter Olympics – Men's qualification

Ice hockey at the 2022 Winter Olympics – Men's qualification

Qualification Results
OTW and OTL Suppose Draw.

Ice Hockey European Championships

Euro Hockey Tour

IIHF European Cup

IIHF Continental Cup

World Championship record

Results
Exclude Olympics (11 Time) and OTW and OTL (Since 2007) Suppose Draw.

Did not enter in 47 editions.

All-time record against other nations

References

External links

IIHF profile
National Teams of Ice Hockey

Men's
National ice hockey teams in Europe